This article presents the discography of American singing duo the Everly Brothers. During their recording career, which stretched between 1956 and 1998, they released 21 studio albums, two live albums, 29 compilation albums and 75 singles.

Studio albums

1950s

1960s

1970s–1980s

Live albums

Compilation albums

Unreleased material

Previously released material and box sets

Singles

1950s

1960s

1970s–1990s

Guest singles

Billboard Year-End performances

Don Everly

Albums

Singles

Phil Everly

Albums

Singles

See also
List of songs recorded by the Everly Brothers

References

External links

Discography
Country music discographies
Discographies of American artists
Rock music group discographies